The Clark County Veterans War Memorial is installed in the Vancouver, Washington portion of the Fort Vancouver National Historic Site, in the United States.

References

External links
 Clark County Veterans War Memorial – Vancouver, Washington at Waymarking

Military monuments and memorials in the United States
Monuments and memorials in Vancouver, Washington
Outdoor sculptures in Vancouver, Washington